Yonas Mellesse, known under the mononym YONAS, is an American hip hop artist from New York City. Between 2015 and 2018, Yonas sold over 150,000+ songs and 20,000 albums, and as of 2017 he had accumulated over 250 million streams digitally. His albums have consistently reached the top five of the iTunes Hip-Hop charts, the top 25 of the iTunes album charts, and the top 50 on the Billboard Hip-Hop charts.

Career 
In 2009 Yonas released his first EP, New Golden Era, independently, winning a Billboard Songwriting Award for his single "Banga". A year later he followed with his first mixtape, produced by Sean Ross, entitled I Am Us, which attracted 30,000 downloads. In 2011 he released his first album on iTunes, The Proven Theory. The music video for his hit single "Shy Kidz" was featured on MTVu and Fuse TV on Demand as the fan-selected winner of an independent artist contest.

The Transition, which is considered Yonas's breakout mixtape, was released in 2012; it attracted 70,000 downloads in the first two months. Yonas was also featured as a Breakout artist in XXL magazine in June 2012. Thanks to The Transition's success, Yonas was able to land a 50-city nationwide tour in the fall of 2012, opening for former musical group AER. Yonas has performed with many notable musicians including Macklemore & Ryan Lewis, Wale, Juicy J, Timeflies, Gorilla Zoe, The White Panda, and Logic.

His music video "Fall Back" appeared in the motion picture, The Place Beyond the Pines (2012), starring Ryan Gosling and Bradley Cooper. His EP The Black Canvas, released on February 4, 2013, appeared as no. 4 on iTunes Hip-Hop/ Rap charts and no. 25 on the iTunes overall album chart.

Personal life
Yonas is married to Shaelyn Mellesse. The couple's daughter was born on March 3, 2018.

Discography

Albums
 The Proven Theory (2011)
 The Transition Deluxe (2013)
 About Time (2018)

EPs
 The New Golden Era (2010)
 The Black Canvas (2013)
 Going Places (2015)
 Everyday Like It's Friday (2016)

Mixtapes
I Am Us (2010)
The Transition (2012)
The Transition 2: Bright Lights, Big City (2013)

Music videos

References

External links 
 Official website

Living people
Singers from New York City
American hip hop singers
American male rappers
Alternative hip hop musicians
21st-century American singers
Rappers from New York City
21st-century American rappers
21st-century American male singers
Year of birth missing (living people)